La Vie de bohème is a French-Italian drama film directed by Marcel L'Herbier. It is based on Scènes de la vie de bohème (1851)  by Henri Murger and includes music from Giacomo Puccini's opera as accompaniment. The set designs were created by Georges Wakhévitch. It was filmed during the winter of 1942–43 at the Victorine Studios in Nice (then under Italian occupation). However it was not released until January 1945, after the liberation of France.

Cast
Maria Denis: Mimì
Louis Jourdan: Rodolfo
Gisèle Pascal: Musetta
Alfred Adam: Alexandre Schaunard
Louis Salou: Colline
André Roussin: Marcello
Jean Parédès: Le vicomte
Suzy Delair: Phémie

References

External links

La Vie de bohème at louisjourdan.net

1945 films
Films based on Scenes of Bohemian Life
Films directed by Marcel L'Herbier
Italian historical drama films
Films set in the 19th century
1940s historical drama films
French historical drama films
French black-and-white films
Italian black-and-white films
1940s French-language films
1940s French films
1940s Italian films